Oath or Affirmation Clause may refer to the following clauses of the United States Constitution:
 The Presidential Oath or Affirmation Clause, Article II, Section 1, Clause 8
 The General Oath or Affirmation Clause, Article VI, Clause 3

It may also refer to the following clauses of the Constitution that reference the taking of an oath or affirmation:
 The Trial of Impeachment Clause, Article I, Section 3, Clause 6
 The Warrants Clause, Fourth Amendment

Clauses of the United States Constitution